Maidu Lake is a small natural freshwater lake in the Cascade Range in eastern Douglas County in the U.S. state of Oregon.

The eastern terminus of the  North Umpqua Trail, which follows the river, is at Maidu Lake. A  connecting trail continues east, intersecting the Pacific Crest Trail between Maidu Lake and Miller Lake.

The lake is periodically re-stocked by volunteers, who bring in hatchery fingerlings by horseback.

See also
 List of lakes in Oregon

References

Lakes of Oregon
Lakes of Douglas County, Oregon
Protected areas of Douglas County, Oregon
Umpqua National Forest